Metabolic Technologies, Inc is an American life sciences company that sells dietary supplements and analytical services. Metabolic Technologies is headquartered in Ames, Iowa.

The company has sponsored a number of clinical trials for the nutritional supplement HMB.

References

External links
 Official site

Nutritional supplement companies of the United States